La Montagne or LaMontagne may refer to:

Places 
 La Montagne, Haute-Saône, a commune in the Haute-Saône department, France
 La Montagne, Loire-Atlantique, a commune in the Loire-Atlantique department, France
 La Montagne, Réunion, a settlement

Other uses 
 La Montagne (newspaper)
 La Montagne (surname)
 The Mountain, a radical political group of the French Revolution, often referred to as the Montagnards

See also 
 Maurice Lamontagne Institute, a marine science research institute in Mont Joli, Quebec, Canada
 Montagne (disambiguation)
 Montagnes (disambiguation)
 The Mountain (disambiguation)